Miss Ecuador 2015, the 65th Miss Ecuador pageant, was held on March 14, 2015. Alejandra Argudo, Miss Ecuador 2014 from Manabí crowned successor Francesca Cipriani from Guayas as Miss Ecuador 2015. The winner represented Ecuador at Miss Universe 2015, the 1st Runner-up competed at Miss International 2015, and the 2nd Runner participated at Miss Supranational 2015.

Results

Placements

Special Awards

Best National Costume

Contestants

Notes

Returns

Last compete in:

2009 
 Cotopaxi
 Imbabura
2010
 Chimborazo
 Tungurahua
2011
 Carchi

Withdraws

 Manabí
 Orellana
 Santa Elena
 Sucumbíos

Crossovers

Elisa Padilla was Reina de Cuenca 2014.
Ariana Freire was Reina de Riobamba 2013.
Mirka Cabrera was Reina de Machala 2014. She competed at Reina Mundial del Banano Ecuador 2014 where she was 1st Runne-up.
Andrea Lara was Reina de Esmeraldas 2013.
Francesca Cipriani was Miss Universitaria 2010, Chica Look Cyzone Ecuador 2011, Chica Look Cyzone Latinoamerica 2011, and she competed in Miss Italian nel Mondo Ecuador 2012 where she was 4th place.
Marlice Grijalva competed in Reina de Ibarra 2014, she was 3rd Runner-up.
Nathaly Quiñónez was Reina de Quinindé 2013, and she competed in Reina de Esmeraldas 2013 where she was 2nd Runner-up.
Ángela Bonilla competed in Miss World Ecuador 2013, she was unplaced.

References

External links
Official Miss Ecuador website

Ecuador
Beauty pageants in Ecuador
Miss Ecuador